Nicolas le Pelley, 11th Seigneur of Sark (1692–1742) was Seigneur of Sark from 1733 to 1742.

References

1692 births
1742 deaths
Seigneurs of Sark
Nicolas